Dendrobium lobbii, commonly known as the straggly rush orchid, is a plant in the orchid family Orchidaceae and is native to an area extending from Indochina to northern Australia. It has thin, wiry stems with stiff leaves and mostly white or cream-coloured flowers singly or in pairs in leaf axils. Its white labellum does not open widely and sometimes remains closed.

Description
Dendrobium lobbii is a terrestrial, perennial, herb which forms small clumps. The side lobes are small and narrow while the middle lobe is egg-shaped, notched and warty. Flowering occurs from December to May but the labellum does not open widely, sometimes remaining closed so that the flower self-pollinates.

Taxonomy and naming
Dendrobium lobbii was first formally described in 1853 by Johannes Elias Teijsmann and Simon Binnendijk from a specimen sent from Singapore and the description was published in Natuurkundig Tijdschrift voor Nederlandsch Indië. The specific epithet (lobbii) honours Thomas Lobb who collected the type specimen.

Distribution and habitat
The straggly rush orchid grows with rushes and sedges in swampy places and near streams. It is found in Thailand, Vietnam, Borneo, the Malay Peninsula, the Philippines, Sulawesi, Sumatra, New Guinea, the Solomon Islands and northern Australia where it occurs in Arnhem Land and the Cape York Peninsula as far south as Cardwell.

References 

lobbii
Plants described in 1853
Orchids of Asia
Orchids of Australia